Piet de Vries (born 6 March 1939) is a Dutch footballer. He played in one match for the Netherlands national football team in 1959.

References

External links
 

1939 births
Living people
Dutch footballers
Netherlands international footballers
Place of birth missing (living people)
Association footballers not categorized by position